The Novice is a 2021 American psychological sports drama film written and directed by Lauren Hadaway (in her feature directorial debut). The film stars Isabelle Fuhrman as an obsessive freshman who joins her university's rowing team. It also stars Amy Forsyth, Dilone, Charlotte Ubben, Jonathan Cherry, and Kate Drummond.

The Novice had its world premiere at the 20th Tribeca Film Festival on June 13, 2021, where it won three awards. The film was simultaneously released in theaters and on VOD on December 17, 2021. It earned five nominations at the 37th Independent Spirit Awards, including Best Feature.

Plot

After a physics class in which she takes the same exam multiple times over, obsessively competitive college freshman Alex Dall sets out to join the Wellington College Novice Rowing Program. Shortly after the first training session her thoughts become occupied with the sport - in particular with the consistent form practiced while rowing.

Jamie Brill, another freshman largely taking up rowing as a means to attain an athletic scholarship, is quickly labeled as the "best novice" on the team to the chagrin of Alex - which further fuels her obsessive drive and compulsive behavior. Over time, Alex improves her rowing times (albeit still behind those of Jamie) at the detriment of her academic performance, and they are both soon moved into the varsity team. While Jamie quickly adapts to the new environment, Alex fails to fit in both socially and athletically - being forced to sit at the back of the bus and accidentally knocking herself out (referred to as "catching a crab") during a major race.

Moved back to the novice team, Alex loses her already tenuous friendship with Jamie - and during the first joint novice/varsity practice passes out while exercising and urinates herself, becoming the subject of derision within the team. After Erin, a varsity rower and trainer, outlines the criteria to officially make varsity but expresses doubt in Alex due to her small stature, Alex begins vigorously practicing alone, but is interrupted by Coach Pete who has been taking increasing notice of her potentially self-harmful level of commitment. Pete initially attempts to dissuade Alex from working so hard, but eventually offers to assist her in using a scull to practice alone during winter break.

Alex steadily improves as a rower by practicing over break, and begins a relationship with her former graduate student instructor Dani. Alex and Jamie are eager to try out for the "1V boat" which the best members of the team row on, but are denied the opportunity by Coaches Pete and Edwards. Meanwhile, Alex's health deteriorates, with a wound on her palm frequently bleeding and failing to heal.

In the spring, Alex and Jamie race to determine who will take the spot of a 1V Rower who has left the team due to a broken collarbone. Alex loses, sensing that the team was assisting the more popular Jamie by sandbagging while rowing on Alex's boat. Dejected, Alex begins to self-harm, while an infection from the wound on her palm begins to spread throughout her arm. Dani breaks up with Alex due to her increasingly destructive behavior and refusal to change.

In the last week of the season, a challenge is set up to beat rower Highsmith's 14 minute record. While intended to be a friendly competition Alex, now fully a pariah within the team, publicly declares her intentions to break the record. The girls set off to row in individual boats on a dark hours of a cold early morning as a thunderstorm sets in. Alex collides her boat into Highsmith's and is thrown into the water, but climbs back on and continues rowing. The rest of the team starts to row back owing to the increasing severity of the storm but Alex persists despite their warnings.

Alex finishes the race as a flash of lightning envelops her, and returns to the training building to the silent shock of her team members and coaches, erasing her name from the chalkboard and seemingly quitting the team. It is left ambiguous as to if Alex has beaten Highsmith's record.

Cast
Isabelle Fuhrman as Alex Dall
Amy Forsyth as Jamie Brill
Dilone as Dani
Jonathan Cherry as Coach Pete
Kate Drummond as Coach Edwards
Jeni Ross as Winona
Eve Kanyo as Groundman
Nikki Duval as Try-Hard
Charlotte Ubben as Erin
Sage Irvine as Janssen
Chantelle Bishop as Highsmith

Release
The film premiered at the Tribeca Film Festival on June 13, 2021.  There, it won the Best U.S. Narrative Feature Film prize.

In August 2021, it was announced that IFC Films acquired North American distribution rights to the film, which was released in select theaters and on demand and digital platforms on December 17, 2021.

Reception

Box office
In its opening weekend, the film earned $12,301 from 36 theaters for a per screen average of $341. In its second weekend, it made $1,034 from only nine theaters. The film dropped to six theaters in its third weekend and earned $1,222.

Critical response
The film has a 95% rating on Rotten Tomatoes based on 60 reviews, with an average rating of 7.80/10. The site's critical consensus reads: "A remarkable first feature for writer-director Lauren Hadaway, The Novice paints a thrilling -- and disturbing -- portrait of obsession." On Metacritic, the film has a weighted average score of 83 out of 100, based on 14 reviews, indicating "universal acclaim".

Jourdain Searles of The Hollywood Reporter gave the film a positive review and wrote, "A film this raw made with such a steady, assured hand only comes along once in a while. We should take notice." Kate Erbland of IndieWire graded the film a B+ and wrote, "The film’s tense score, from composer Alex Weston, adds to the sense that The Novice is more a horror film than anything else, with a series of intriguing, vintage song choices alternately cutting and upping that tension..." Hoi-Tran Bui of Slash Film rated it an 8 out of 10 and wrote, "It's an impressive feat of incisively dark tone, even if the plot and characters are little more than shadows."

Alex Saveliev of Film Threat also rated the film an 8 out of 10 and wrote, "Hadaway may be a novice at helming feature-length films, but that doesn’t make her any less of a visionary."

Accolades

References

External links
 
 
 

2021 films
2021 directorial debut films
2021 independent films
2021 LGBT-related films
2021 psychological thriller films
2021 thriller drama films
2020s English-language films
2020s psychological drama films
2020s sports drama films
American independent films
American LGBT-related films
American psychological drama films
American psychological thriller films
American sports drama films
Films set in universities and colleges
Films shot in Ontario
IFC Films films
LGBT-related drama films
Rowing films
2020s American films